Ali Amzad Government Girls' High School is a public secondary school located at Moulvibazar Sadar Upazila, Moulvibazar in Sylhet, Bangladesh.

References 

High schools in Bangladesh
Schools in Moulvibazar District
Moulvibazar Sadar Upazila